Iravadiidae is a family of minute sea snails, marine gastropod molluscs in the superfamily Truncatelloidea and the clade Littorinimorpha.

Genera 
Genera within the family Iravadiidae include:
 Acliceratia Ponder, 1984
 Auricorona Golding, 2014
 † Cavilabium Cossmann, 1888 
 Ceratia H. & A. Adams, 1852
 Chevallieria Cossmann, 1888
 Fluviocingula Kuroda & Habe, 1954
 Hyala H. & A. Adams, 1852
 Iravadia H. Blanford, 1867
 † Kalchreuthia Gründel & Nützel, 1998 
 Lantauia Ponder, 1994
 Liroceratia Ponder, 1984
 Nozeba Iredale, 1915
 † Pasitheola Cossmann, 1896 
 Pellamora Iredale, 1943
 Pseudomerelina Ponder, 1984
 Pseudonoba O. Boettger, 1902
 Rehderiella Brandt, 1974
 Rissopsis  Garrett, 1873
 Wakauria Kuroda & Habe, 1954
Genera brought into synonymy
  † Antinodulus Cossmann, 1919: synonym of Nozeba Iredale, 1915
 Dipsotoma Laseron, 1956: synonym of Iravadia (Pseudonoba) Boettger, 1902 represented as Iravadia Blanford, 1867
 Fairbankia Blanford, 1868: synonym of Iravadia (Fairbankia) Stoliczka, 1868 represented as Iravadia Blanford, 1867
 Fluviocingula Kuroda & Habe, 1954: synonym of Iravadia (Fluviocingula) Kuroda & Habe, 1954 represented as Iravadia Blanford, 1867
 Iraqirissoa Dance & Eames, 1966: synonym of Iravadia (Pseudonoba) Boettger, 1902 represented as Iravadia Blanford, 1867
 Lucidinella Laseron, 1956: synonym of Iravadia (Pseudonoba) Boettger, 1902 represented as Iravadia Blanford, 1867
 Mesodestea Laseron, 1956: synonym of Iravadia (Fluviocingula) Kuroda & Habe, 1954 represented as Iravadia Blanford, 1867
 Nanadoma Laseron, 1956: synonym of Chevallieria Cossmann, 1888
 Paronoba Laseron, 1950: synonym of Iravadia (Pseudonoba) Boettger, 1902 represented as Iravadia Blanford, 1867
 † Pasithea I. Lea, 1833: synonym of † Pasitheola Cossmann, 1896 †
 Pellamora Iredale, 1943: synonym of Iravadia (Fairbankia) Stoliczka, 1868 represented as Iravadia Blanford, 1867
 Pseudonoba O. Boettger, 1902: synonym of Iravadia (Pseudonoba) Boettger, 1902 represented as Iravadia Blanford, 1867
 Sinusicola Kuroda & Habe, 1950: synonym of Iravadia (Pseudonoba) Boettger, 1902 represented as Iravadia Blanford, 1867
Syntharella Laseron, 1955: synonym of Nozeba Iredale, 1915

References 

 Ponder W. F. (1984). A review of the genera of the Iravadiidae (Gastropoda: Rissoacea) with an assessment of the relationships of the Family. Malacologia 25(1): 21-71
 Vaught, K.C. (1989). A classification of the living Mollusca. American Malacologists: Melbourne, FL (USA). . XII, 195 pp.

External links

 Images from the Natural History Museum of Rotterdam